The Battle of Wireless Ridge was an engagement of the Falklands War which took place on the night from 13 to 14 June 1982, between British and Argentine forces during the advance towards the Argentine-occupied capital of the Falkland Islands, Port Stanley.

Wireless Ridge was one of seven strategic hills within five miles of Stanley at  that had to be taken in order for the Island's capital to be approached. The attack was successful, and the entire Argentine force on the Islands surrendered later that day.

The British force consisted of 2nd Battalion, The Parachute Regiment (2 Para), a troop of the Blues & Royals, with two FV101 Scorpion and two FV107 Scimitar light tanks, as well as artillery support from two batteries of 29 Commando Regiment Royal Artillery and naval gunfire support provided by 's 4.5-in gun.

The Argentine force consisted of the 7th Infantry Regiment as well as detachments from other units. The first Argentine unit to arrive in the sector was that commanded by Major José Rodolfo Banetta that took up residence inside the Moody Brook Barracks, but this unit had to evacuate the area on 11 June when British fire struck the building, killing three Argentine soldiers and wounding an officer. At first, the 7th Regiment on Wireless Ridge was relatively comfortable, shooting sheep and roasting them on old bed frames the soldiers had found nearby. Private Guillermo Vélez maintains that he personally shot and killed 50 sheep during his time on Wireless Ridge.

Background

After heavy losses during the Battle of Goose Green, including their commander, Lieutenant Colonel 'H' Jones, command of 2 Para passed to Lieutenant-Colonel David Chaundler, who was in England at the time of the battle. Chaundler flew to Ascension Island on a Vickers VC10 and then to the Falklands on a C-130 Hercules that was dropping supplies by parachute.

Four days after Goose Green, Chaundler joined 2 Para. After debriefing the battalion's officers about Goose Green and the events following, he vowed that the unit would never again go into action without fire support.

From Fitzroy, 2 Para were moved by helicopter to Bluff Cove Peak where they were held in reserve. The first line of hills: Two Sisters, Mount Longdon and Mount Harriet, were taken. Three other hills were then slated to be captured: Mount Tumbledown by the Scots Guards, Mount William by the Gurkhas and Wireless Ridge by 2 Para. The final phase of 3 Commando Brigade's campaign, the battle for Stanley, would follow the capture of these hills.

On the morning of 13 June, it became clear that the attacks on Tumbledown had been successful, so 2 Para marched around the back of Mount Longdon to take up their positions for the assault on Wireless Ridge. As the action was expected to be concluded quickly, they took only their weapons and as much ammunition as possible, leaving most other gear behind in the camp. On Bluff Cove Peak, the Battalion's mortars and heavy machine guns were attacked by Argentine A-4 Skyhawks, which delayed their planned move forward, although they suffered no casualties.

Initial assault

In the closing hours of 13 June, D Company (Coy) began the attack sequence, advancing upon 'Rough Diamond' hill north-west of Mount Longdon. It had been hit by an intense barrage from British guns, from land and sea.

In the softening-up bombardment, British artillery had fired 6,000 rounds with their 105 mm pieces, and as the British paratroopers began their push, they were further backed by naval fire and the 76 and 30 mm guns mounted on the light tanks. The approximately 80 casualties sustained by 2 Para two weeks earlier at the Battle of Goose Green (including the loss of their commanding officer), had induced them not to take any unnecessary chances the second time around. The Argentine commanding officer, Lt.Col. Omar Giménez, says that three or four times he was nearly killed by a direct hit during the softening-up bombardment.

When D Coy reached the hill, they found that the Argentine compañía C of the 7th Infantry Regiment had withdrawn due to the heavy bombardment. As Major Philip Neame's D Coy started to consolidate their position, the Argentine 7th Regiment launched a series of heavy recoilless rifle, rocket and mortar attacks on Mount Longdon, causing casualties to the 3rd Battalion, The Parachute Regiment (3 Para).

With this massive fire support, A and B Coys were convinced the enemy on the 'Apple Pie' feature had been defeated, and began to advance confidently, but they met fierce resistance when they left their trenches. They came under heavy machine-gun fire; massive retaliation was initiated by the British machine-gunners and the guns of the Blues and Royals light tanks.

One Mount Longdon survivor from 3 Para recalled the British attack which was initially repulsed by the Argentines:

The Argentine defenders there eventually withdrew in the face of such withering fire, and A and B Coys took their objective. By this stage of the battle, there were not many experienced Argentine officers left; the Forward Artillery Observation Officer (Major Guillermo Nani), the Operations Officer (Captain Carlos Ferreyra) and the compañía A and C commanders (Captains Jorge Calvo and Hugo García) and at least three senior platoon commanders (First Lieutenants Antonio Estrada, Jorge Guidobono and Ramon Galíndez-Matienzo) were wounded. C Coy then moved down from their northern start line to advance to a position east of Wireless Ridge where they found a platoon position was unoccupied.

By about 4.30am, Lieutenant-Colonel Gimenez knew that the 7th Infantry Regiment had been decisively defeated; Communications are lost, my whole regiment is finished, but other attached units continued to fight.

SAS diversionary raid

The Special Air Service, along with men from the Special Boat Squadron, carried out  a diversionary raid immediately north of Port Stanley on the night of 13–14 June. The plan was, as 2 PARA attacked the northern half of Wireless Ridge, 30 SAS and SBS commandos aboard 4 Rigid Raiders would speed across the Murrell River entrance and attack the oil storage facilities on Cortley Ridge. However, before it could reach its objective, the assault force was illuminated by a spotlight on the Argentine Almirante Irízar hospital ship (illegally preparing to collect Major José Ricardo Spadaro's 601 National Gendarmerie Special Forces Squadron on Navy Point for a major insertion behind 2 PARA). A massive amount of fire, including 30mm anti-aircraft guns arched down onto the SAS/SBS force from positions along the northern shore, caused the British raiders to withdraw. Three British commandos were wounded and all the Rigid Raiders involved were damaged beyond repair. Thus the raid achieved its aim of convincing the defenders that a major sea-borne landing was about to happen.

Final assault
Led by Captain Rodrigo Alejandro Soloaga, two platoons (under Lieutenant Luis Bertolini and Second Lieutenant Diego Bianchi-Harrington) from the Argentine 10th Armoured Cavalry Reconnaissance Squadron (which normally operated the Panhard AML) arrived on foot as reinforcements and took over the abandoned positions of the 7th Regiment Reconnaissance Platoon (under Lieutenant Francisco Ramón Galindez-Matienzo) in the western rocks of Wireless Ridge.

Maj. Philip Neame's D Coy (2 Para) then began the final assault from the western end of Wireless Ridge, under the cover of fire from 's 4.5 inch gun, four light tanks, twelve 105 mm artillery pieces, several mortars and anti-tank rockets.
As the Argentine 7th Infantry absorbed the attack, Soloaga's patrol engaged British forces on "Apple Pie", including the tanks, a Milan platoon and a machine gun platoon. Over the course of two hours the 10th Squadron suffered six dead and 50 wounded.

D Coy took the first half of their objective after a hard fight with a platoon of Argentine paratroopers under 2nd Lt Gustavo Alberto Aimar of the 2nd Airborne Infantry Regiment. While Neame's company was able to overrun the Argentine paratroopers, wounding Aimar and several of his men, the British suffered two killed (Privates David Parr and Francis Slough) in the process. Neame's men then came under fierce attack from Maj. Guillermo Berazay's Compañía A, 3rd Regiment which had tried to move forward to Mt Longdon during the fighting two nights earlier but had only reached Moody Brook valley. With Lt José Luis Dobroevic's 81mm Mortar Platoon providing fire support, the company, in the form of the platoons of Subteniente (Sub-Lieutenant) Carlos Javier Aristegui and 2nd Lt Víctor Rodriguez-Pérez advanced to contact. Private Patricio Pérez from Aristegui's platoon, recalled the unnerving experience of 66 mm rockets coming straight at them like undulating fireballs. He believed he shot a British paratrooper, possibly 12 Platoon's commander, and became enraged when he heard that his friend, Horacio Benítez from his platoon, had been shot.

According to Private Horacio Benítez from Aristegui's platoon:

The platoon of 2nd Lt Rodriguez-Pérez delivered a frontal assault and in fact closed in with the British 12 Platoon, under the command of Lt Jonathan Page (following the death of Lt Barry at Goose Green). The fight surged back and forth. Lt Page managed to hold the line, but only just.

Commenting later on the action, retired Major-General John Frost (who in 1944 as a lieutenant-colonel had commanded 2 Para during the Battle of Arnhem) describes the attack on 12 Platoon: "For two very long hours the company remained under pressure. Small-arms fire mingled with all types of HE [high explosive rifle-grenades] fell in and around 12 Platoon's position as the men crouched in the abandoned enemy sangars [a type of fortification] and in shell holes."
According to Neame: "Then from the east we got this counterattack. Jon Page, whose platoon I had left up that end did a really bloody good job. He managed to get hold of our artillery by flicking his radio onto their net, as we were still without our FOO. That broke up their attack."
Private Graham Carter from D Coy confirms that several men in Aristegui's platoon had managed to sneak into the rocks through which 12 Platoon had come earlier: "We were out in the open on limb, and it looked like 10 and 11 Platoons were shooting at us. We asked the OC [Neame] to come over and check our position. He bimbled across seeming oblivious to tracer all around him, then wandered back. We thought, 'silly bugger'. Then our platoon commander [Lt Jonathan Page] stood up, shouted to everyone to keep down and was knocked over himself, hit in the leg. He was screaming and shouting, but when the medic stripped him off there was no wound, just massive bruising where the round had hit his ammunition pouch."

Neame's officers and NCOs rallied the men to capture the final part of their objective and in the face of heavy fire, the Argentines having run out of ammunition, broke and retreated, covered by supporting machine gun fire, controlled by Lt Horacio Alejandro Mones-Ruiz of Berazay's compañía. Privates Esteban Tríes and José Cerezuela of Rodriguez-Pérez's platoon, volunteered to stay behind and rescue their wounded platoon sergeant, Manuel Villegas, laboriously carrying him to Port Stanley.

Private Michael Savage and other survivors from Compañía C were the first 7th Regiment troops to reach the relative safety of Port Stanley, only to be greeted with shock and disdain, he recalls, by immaculately dressed staff officers: "They had been sleeping in houses, in warm beds. They had shiny shoes, pristine ironed uniforms and waxed moustaches. They even had heating in their cars. I was so furious with them."

The battle was not yet over. Lt-Col. Eugenio Dalton, an Argentine 10th Brigade staff officer, during the pre-dawn darkness of 14 June, was seen driving around in a jeep, marshalling tired, panicky and dazed soldiers from various units into a company and leading them into Stanley's western sector, under heavy fire. Some 200 survivors from Wireless Ridge had been rallied by Dalton to form, under heavy gunfire, a last-ditch defensive line in front of the now silenced guns of the 4th Airborne Artillery Group near the racecourse. Near the church in Stanley, intent on helping Berazay, Maj. Carrizo-Salvadores, Second-in-command of the 7th Regiment, helped by the chaplain Father José Fernández, mustered about 50 Wireless Ridge survivors and led them on a bayonet charge, with the soldiers chanting their famous 'Malvinas March', but were stopped by heavy artillery and machine-gun fire. The Paras were momentarily alarmed and watched surprised, with Neame describing it as "quite a sporting effort, but one without a sporting chance". Neame later gave more details: "Then as daylight began we got another counter-attack, this time from the Moody Brook side onto Sean Webster's platoon. I thought 'bloody hell, what's going on around here?' I wondered what we had got into and thought that this was most unlike the Argentinians. For a while they were quite persistent."

2 Para had suffered three dead and 11 wounded. Its mortar platoon also reported four mortarmen with broken ankles after having fired supercharge rounds for extra range, in order to repel the Argentine counterattack force that had attacked from Moody Brook. The Argentines suffered approximately 25 dead and about 125 wounded, about 50 were taken prisoner. In the final stages of the battle, Brigadier-General Jofre had been offered the use of Skyhawks to bomb Wireless Ridge with napalm but declined in the belief that the British response would be commensurate.

Aftermath 

Along with other key battles in the latter part of British activity under Operation Corporate, such as the Battle of Mount Tumbledown, the success at Wireless Ridge constituted one of the last major battles of the war before the subsequent surrender of Argentina. In the wake of the battle, British forces witnessed the Argentine soldiers pull back toward Stanley, before continuing to turn firepower onto them as they retreated, with one officer remarking "It was a most pathetic sight, and one which I never wish to see again."

Not wanting to replicate the heavy losses of Goose Green, the British had focussed a heavy artillery bombardment onto the opposing troops before undertaking the main assault, an action that would strongly affect the morale of the Argentine soldiers. The barrage lowered their will to fight significantly, spreading a sense of hopelessness through the forces as they retreated.A well-trained British battalion would also have been hard-pressed and forced to relinquish the position under the same circunstances, according to one military analyst who studied the battle in great detail.

With the opposing forces in retreat, and the successful capture of several key positions, including Wireless Ridge and Mount Tumbledown, the British obtained permission to advance on Stanley, with 2 Para leading the first troops into the town since Argentinian forces had first occupied the territory at the beginning of the war in April 1982. After its recapture, the Argentine surrender came into effect from 14 June.

For the bravery shown at Wireless Ridge, 2 Para was awarded three Military Crosses, one Military Medal and one Distinguished Conduct Medal. 29 Commando was awarded one Military Cross.

In 2022, retired Lieutenant-Colonels Víctor Hugo Rodríguez-Perez and Philip Neame met for the first time in London and exchanged signed copies of their books, Penal Company on the Falklands: A Memoir of the Parachute Regiment at War 1982 and Llevando la Patria al Hombro (Carrying the weight of the Fatherland on your shoulders).

See also
 Falklands War

References

Notes

Bibliography 
 
 
 Jolly, Rick (1983) The red and green life machine : a diary of the Falklands Field Hospital, London: Century, 
 
 Paul, James and Spirit, Martin (2002) Second time around for 2 Para: The Battle for Wireless Ridge, Britain's Small Wars, WWW site, Accessed 19 March 2007

External links
Anglo-Argentine Alan Craig tells of fight for Wireless Ridge
recollections of Anglo-Argentine conscript Michael Savage of the 7th Infantry Regiment's C Company

Wireless Ridge
Parachute Regiment (United Kingdom)
Household Cavalry
British Army in the Falklands War
June 1982 events in South America